Kalle Albinus Viljamaa (15 March 1885 – 28 March 1918) was a Finnish wrestler. He competed in the heavyweight event at the 1912 Summer Olympics.

Viljamaa died of White Guard artillery shelling during the Finnish Civil War Battle of Tampere.

References

External links
 

1885 births
1918 deaths
Olympic wrestlers of Finland
Wrestlers at the 1912 Summer Olympics
Finnish male sport wrestlers
Sportspeople from Tampere
Civilians killed in World War I